Kohinoor is an Indian mystery television series that aired on Sahara One. The series premiered on 5 September 2005 starring Kuljeet Randhawa. The channel launched a Diwali contest named "Kohinoor Ki Diwali Heeron Waali" from October 17 to 31, where it gave away 45 laks worth of diamonds to 300 randomly selected participants.

Plot
The story is of a young NRI Indian woman, Irawati Kohli, who lives in England and works for an art house. She comes to India in search of new things. Being raised in a foreign country, she knows very little about India.

Her life spirals out of control when she is charged with a murder. The victim turns out to be her grandfather who has left behind some bizarre clues. Now, to solve the mystery of his death, Irawati meets two strange men: Samar, a mysterious stranger and Karan, a besotted charmer. Suddenly she realizes that the Kohinoor, a most sought-after diamond taken away by the British, could be in India. And this could also be the reason of her grandfather's death, since he knew something about the diamond. Now the question remains: Will Irawati be able to find this invaluable diamond? And who else is looking for it so desperately that they could kill for it?

Cast
 Kuljeet Randhawa as Irawati Kohli
 Manish Wadhwa as Kali
 Amit Sadh as Karan Saxena
 Neeru Bajwa as Seductress
 Tarun Khanna as Rakesh Mehra (Neeru's Consort and Associate)
 Ankur Nayyar as Samar Khanna
 Murli Sharma as Abbas Bhai
 Zarina Wahab as Irawati's Mother 
 Rahul Singh as Abhimanyu
 Ajinkya Dev as Shinde
 Lucky Raajput as Naariyal Paani Wala

References

External links
Kohinoor Official Site on Sahara One

Sahara One original programming
2005 Indian television series debuts
2005 Indian television series endings
Indian mystery television series
Golconda diamonds